Schmidt's mountain brook frog (Duellmanohyla schmidtorum) is a species of frog in the family Hylidae. It is endemic to the Pacific slopes of the Sierra Madre de Chiapas in southwestern Guatemala and southern Mexico in eastern Oaxaca and southwestern Chiapas. It is named after Karl Patterson Schmidt, American herpetologist, and his brother Frank, who collected with him.

It is threatened by habitat loss caused by deforestation and infrastructure development, and possibly, chytridiomycosis.

References

External links

Duellmanohyla
Amphibians of Guatemala
Amphibians of Mexico
Amphibians described in 1954
Taxa named by Laurence Cooper Stuart
Taxonomy articles created by Polbot